Van Veen is a Dutch toponymic surname. Notable people with the surname include:

 Anne van Veen (born 1983), Dutch cabaret artist, daughter of Herman
 Anneloes van Veen (born 1990), Dutch competitive sailor
 Babette van Veen (born 1968), Dutch actor and singer, daughter of Herman
 Chris van Veen (1922–2009), Dutch State Secretary, minister and chairperson of VNO
 Gertruida van Veen (1602-1643), Flemish painter
 Gijsbert van Veen (1558–1630), Dutch painter and engraver, brother of Otto
 Herman van Veen (born 1945), Dutch singer and actor
 Jeroen van Veen (born 1969), Dutch pianist
 Jeroen van Veen (born 1974), Dutch bassist
 Johan van Veen (1893–1959), Dutch civil engineer who originated the Delta Works
 José van Veen (born 1986), Dutch rower
 Kevin van Veen (born 1991), Dutch footballer
 Leo van Veen (born 1946), Dutch football player and coach
 Maarten van Veen (born 1971), Dutch pianist and conductor
 Maerten van Veen, better known as Maarten van Heemskerck (1498–1574), Dutch painter
 Michiel van Veen (born 1971), Dutch politician
 Otto van Veen or Otto Venius (c.1556–1629), Dutch painter, draughtsman, and humanist 
 Ricky Van Veen (born c. 1981), American entrepreneur, co-founder of CollegeHumor
 Rie van Veen (1923–1995), Dutch swimmer
 Rochus van Veen (1630–1693), Dutch painter
 Rudolph van Veen (born 1967), Dutch TV-chef and cookbook author
  (1856–1924), Dutch theologian
 Stuyvesant Van Veen (1910–1988), American artist and muralist
 Suzanne van Veen (born 1987), Dutch cyclist
 Sven van Veen (born 1961), member of Dutch hip-hop duo MC Miker G & DJ Sven

See also
 Ada or Ardor: A Family Chronicle, a novel in which one of the primary characters is named Van Veen
 Mount Van Veen, a mountain in Antarctica, named after the American geologist Richard C. Van Veen
 Van der Veen, Dutch surname
 Van Veen (motorcycle), a Dutch former manufacturer of motorcycles
 Van Veen Grab Sampler, an instrument to sample sediment in the ocean
 Veen (disambiguation)

Dutch-language surnames
Surnames of Dutch origin